Event One of the 2015 Monster Energy FIM Speedway World Cup was the opening race of the 2015 edition of the Speedway World Cup. It was run on June 6 at Stadion Miejski in Gniezno, Poland and was won by Sweden from hosts Poland, Russia, and the Czech Republic. As a result, Sweden progressed directly to the 2015 Speedway World Cup Final, while Poland and Russia progressed to the 2015 Speedway World Cup Race-off. The Czech Republic were eliminated.

Sweden were led to victory by Linus Sundström and Antonio Lindbäck, both of whom scored double figures. They were supported by Peter Ljung and Andreas Jonsson, who scored nine and eight points respectively. The meeting was somewhat overshadowed by an injury to Polish captain Jarosław Hampel, who broke his leg in two places after colliding with Russia's Vitaly Belousov in just the fourth heat of the meeting. As a result, Poland were forced to ride the rest of the meeting with just three riders.

Results

Scores

References

See also 
 2015 Speedway Grand Prix

2015 Speedway World Cup